Suseela Prabhakaran is an Indian ophthalmologist and chief ophthalmic surgeon at Divya Prabha Eye Hospital. She started her career as a lecturer in ophthalmology, in the Department of Medical Education, Government of Kerala, India.

She was actively involved with the improvement in health cares services in Kerala state, especially in the field of ophthalmology. Through NGO's like the WHO and Innerwheel she was able to introduce major advances in eye care to the people of Kerala.

Dr. Suseela Prabhakaran was instrumental in upgrading the Government Eye Hospital Trivandrum to a Regional Institute of Ophthalmology. She was also the Advisor in Ophthalmology to the Government of Kerala.

She established Divya Prabha Eye Hospital on leaving Government service.

Awards received 
Suseela Prabhakaran has been given many awards for her contributions to the ophthalmological field. Prabhakaran was given a Carapet Gold medal for securing first rank in the state for the SSLC examination. Prabhakaran was a gold medallist for the final year in her Bachelor of Medicine, Bachelor of Surgery  program at the University of Kerala in Kerala, India. The World Health Organization granted Suseela Prabhakaran a Fellowship Award in Ophthalmic Microsurgery in 1981 as well. Lions Club International gave Prabhakaran a Knight of the Blind award and the Indian Red Cross Society granted her a Platinum Jubilee Award. Nethaji Smaraka Samithi awarded Sueela Prabhakaran the Sevana Ratna award.

Scientific contributions 

Prabhakaran has written several articles in scientific journals and has been cited in the Indian Science Abstracts. Of the 45 million blind people in the world, 12 million of them live in India. Suseela Prabhakaran has been able to increase eye health of the population of Kerala, India by performing cornea graft surgeries and many other procedures that correct or improve cataracts on patients. Eye donation has been a major topic of interest for advocates of corneal grafting in recent years. Prabhakaran advocates for eye donation to counteract the major cataract issue faced by many residents of Kerala, India.

Divya Prabha Eye Hospital 
The Divya Prabha Eye Hospital was founded by Prabhakaran in hopes to protect the quality of vision in the community of Kerala, India. Prabhakaran was able to carry out the efforts of Dr. N. Prabhakaran—who died a year after establishing this clinic—and turned it into a full hospital with the ability to accommodate for cataract and glaucoma surgeries. The most common cause of blindness of the people of Kerala and other parts of India is cataract in terms of ophthalmological issues. Other ophthalmological problems in India include glaucoma, corneal blindness, posterior segment disorder, and many others. Prabhakaran's desire for this facility was to provide the best care for patients at an affordable price.

After establishment as a clinic, the resources necessary for surgery were not available quite yet, which explains why patients advised for surgery were directed to a hospital in close proximity. When this hospital underwent the project of expansion to accommodate surgical procedures, a theatre complex was added, consisting of separate areas designed for septic procedures and a sterile air corridor. The doctors of this hospital work to update technology for the treatment of vision ailments and continue to educate themselves at conferences throughout the year. Although this facility is now a hospital, Prabhakaran has not stopped treating people who may not have the resources to afford such surgeries.

References

External links
Official web site of Divya Prabha Eye Hospital

Medical doctors from Thiruvananthapuram
Living people
Indian ophthalmologists
Women ophthalmologists
Year of birth missing (living people)
Indian women surgeons
Women scientists from Kerala
20th-century Indian medical doctors
20th-century Indian women scientists
Indian surgeons
20th-century women physicians
20th-century surgeons